New Zealand Muslim Association (NZMA) established in 1950 is the oldest Islamic institution in New Zealand. The New Zealand Muslim Association (NZMA) was formed in the year 1950, with the objective to serve all Muslims brothers and sisters within New Zealand. The first chairman of NZMA was Marhum Suilman Ismail Bhikoo. He was instrumental in establishing a Muslim burial ground at Waikumete Cemetery in Glen Eden, West Auckland in 1966. Former presidents of the NZMA include Kosovo-born Mazhar Krasniqi (1975 and 1987–88) and Nazmi Mehmeti from the Republic of Macedonia (1963). The longest serving Executive Committee member between 1956 and 1981 was Hajji Avdo Musovich (1919–2001), originally from Montenegro. NZMA is responsible for the five branches; Ponsonby mosque, Ranui mosque, Avondale Islamic Centre, Birkenhead Islamic Centre and Kelston Islamic Centre. More information can be found on the NZMA website: www.nzma.kiwi.nz

List of mosques

Ponsonby Mosque ( Al-Masjid Al-Jamie)

On 30 March 1979 the foundation for the Mosque for first mosque in New Zealand was laid. Further extensions was completed in 1986, which created a praying area for ladies, accommodation for the Imam, kitchen facilities, Janaza washing room and additional prayer hall for Jumma prayers. Ponsonby Mosque was re-named to Al-Masjid Al-Jamie to give the mosque an Islamic name in the late 20th century. Today the Al-Masjid Al-Jamie has a total capacity of 700 people.

Avondale Islamic Centre

Avondale Islamic Centre (AIC), in Avondale, Auckland, New Zealand. Primarily serves as a mosque, providing a place to conduct the five daily prayers and extra devotional prayers such as Ramadan night prayers (tarawih) for males and females. However, the Centre also offers a number of wide ranging services, including event hosting facilities, teaching and a multi-purpose area with a car park for over 40 vehicles.

West Auckland Mosque (WAM) - Ranui

West Auckland Mosque & Islamic Centre is the 3rd Mosque in New Zealand built in June 1995. West Auckland Mosque provides 5 daily prayers with Jamat, Juma, Full Quran Tarawih prayers, Youth programs, ladies programs and Daily madrasah classes and now Adult Quran classes. Today approx.2,500 Muslims live in West Auckland and over +500 households. The mosque can accommodate up to 400 people with up to 30 car parks.

Birkenhead Islamic Centre

Birkenhead Islamic Center a branch of NZMA, was formed on 4 June 2006 but opened for regular prayers in 2010 for residents of North Shore of Auckland, which comprises many suburbs, such as Birkenhead, Birkdale, Beach Haven, Glenfield, Wairau Park, Hilcrest, Foresthill, Takapuna, Bayswater, Devonport, Cambles Bay, Mairangi Bay, Browns Bay, Long Bay, Upper Harbour, and Albany. That was the starting point, Alhamdulillah, due to the steadfast effort of the regular attendees of daily prayers and motivated Muslim brothers.

Kelston Islamic Centre

Kelston Masjid, previously under Abu Huraira Trust came into existence in August 2003. Prior to this, a group of local residents began congregating for Salah, Jummah & Tarawih prayers at Brother Azeem’s resident, which developed into the idea of establishing a local place of worship. As such, Abu Huraira Trust was formed and a property, previously mechanical workshop, was purchased. And so, began the journey of Kelston Masjid. On 16 August 2018, Abu Huraira Trust transferred the property to New Zealand Muslim Association (NZMA) Incorporated. Lead by Brother Mohammed Fazal (administrator), NZMA-Kelston Branch was established and an interim committee appointed. The interim committee, with assistance from local worshippers, successfully continued all prayers and Islamic programmes, until a new committee was elected in February 2020.
In 1959 it purchased a house in Ponsonby, central Auckland, and converted it into the first Islamic Centre in the country. In 1960 the NZMA invited Ahmed Said Musa Patel from the Gujarat to become New Zealand's first Imam. In 1967 this house was sold and another bought; in 1972 this too was sold and another acquired at 17 Vermont Street, Ponsonby. In 1979 the house on this site was removed and construction work began to build New Zealand's first real mosque. Also in 1979 the NZMA was a founding constituent member of the Federation of Islamic Associations of New Zealand (FIANZ), the national Muslim organisation.

References

Berryman, Warren, and Draper, John, "Meat exporters resist costly Islamic crusade" in The National Business Review (May, 1979), Volume 9, No.16 (Issue 333), p. 1.
Bishop, Martin C., ` "A History of the Muslim Community in New Zealand to 1980", thesis submitted in partial fulfilment of the requirement for the degree of M.A. in history at the University of Waikato’ (Waikato University, 1997).
"Growing Support For Queen St Protest March" in The Auckland Star (26 August 1968), p. 3.
"3000 stage city protest" in The Auckland Star (28 August 1968), p. 1.
"City Mosque For Muslims" in The New Zealand Herald (28 March 1979), p. 1.
De Graaf, Peter, "The Kiwi Kosovars" in Metro (June, 2001), pp. 89–93.
Drury, Abdullah, "A Short History of the Ponsonby Mosque, New Zealand" in Al-Nahdah (Malaysia), Vol.19, No.3, pp. 36–38.
Drury, Abdullah, "A Short History: New Zealand’s First Mosque" in The Muslim World League Journal (Dhul-Qa‘adah 1421 - February 2001), Vol.28, No.11, pp. 45–48.
Drury, Abdullah, "A Short History of the Ponsonby Mosque, Auckland" in Da’wah Highlights (Rabi-ul Awwal 1422 - June 2001), Vol.XII, Issue 6, pp. 43–50.
Drury, Abdullah, "A Tribute to the Illyrian Pioneers" in Al Mujaddid (March 2002 - Muharram 1423), Vol.1, No.16, p. 10.
Drury, Abdullah, Islam in New Zealand: The First Mosque (Christchurch, 2007) 
Drury, Abdullah, "Mazhar Krasniqi Now QSM" in Al Mujaddid (20 March 2003 - Muharram 1424), p. 16.
Drury, Abdullah, "Mazharbeg" in Al Mujaddid (21 June 2003 - Rabiul Thani 1424), Vol.1, p. 14.
"Eastern Dome For Skyline" in The New Zealand Herald (7 April 1980), p. 2.
"Islamic Meat Trade" in The Otago Daily Times (12 March 1979), p. 1.
Krasniqi, Mazhar, "Message" in Al Mujaddid (January 2000), p. 4.
MacIntyre, Dave, "$3m Being Sent To NZ For Building Of Two Mosques" in The Evening Post (29 November 1978), p. 44.
Mannion, Robert, "Moslems Caught in Classic Dilemma" in The Dominion Sunday Times (26 February 1989), p. 11.
Middleton, Julie, "NZ Muslim leader honoured" in The New Zealand Herald (22 August 2005), p. 10.
"Mohammad Sharif Madhavi Hojatol Islam spends most of his time supervising halal killing in freezing works." in The Auckland Star (14 April 1980), p. 7.
Moore, Leanne, "Muslims and Catholics in single salute" in The New Zealand Herald (30 September 1995), p. 24.
"Moslem Group Form NZ Federation" in The New Zealand Herald (2 May 1979), p. 10.
"Muslims begin the holy month of Ramadan" in The New Zealand Herald (27 January 1996), p. 17.
"Muslims plan mosque for city" in The Auckland Star (4 January 1956), p. 5.
"Muslims Raising Funds for a Mosque" in The New Zealand Herald (4 January 1956), p. 8.
"Muslims Raising Meat Deal Snags" in The Evening Post (4 August 1979), p. 8.
"Musovich" in The New Zealand Herald (17–18 November 2001), D13.
"N.Z. Moslems Support Arab Cause" in The New Zealand Herald (12 June 1967), p. 1.
"Obituary Notice" in Al Mujaddid (December 2001 - Shawaal 1422), Vol.1, No.15, p. 9.
"Obituary" in RISEAP Newsletter (December 2001), p. 4.
Thomson, Ainsley, "Mazhar Krasniqi" in The New Zealand Herald (31 December 2002), p.A6.
Trickett, Peter, "Minarets in Ponsonby" in The New Zealand Listener (21 April 1979), pp. 18–19.
Waja, Ismail, "50 Years Celebrations" in Al Mujaddid (July 2001), p. 1-2, 7.
New Zealand Gazette (10 January 2003), Issue No.2., p. 83.
Zaman, Gul, "In Memory Of Marhum Demal Hodzic" in FIANZ News (March 2006), page.7.

Islamic organisations based in New Zealand
Islamic organizations established in 1950